Downingia concolor is a species of flowering plant in the bellflower family known by the common names maroonspot calicoflower and fringed downingia. This showy wildflower is endemic to California, where it is a resident of ponds and vernal pool ecosystems in the northern part of the state.

Description
This annual grows on a branching erect stem with small leaves at intervals. At the top of each stem branch is one or more flowers, each about a centimeter wide. The tubular flower has two long, narrow, pointed upper lobes which may be blue or purple. The three lower lobes are fused into one three-lobed surface, which is blue or purple with a large blotch of white in the center and blotches of maroon toward the mouth of the tube. There may also be speckles of yellow.

References

External links

Jepson Manual Treatment
USDA Plants Profile
Photo gallery

concolor
Flora of California